Evie and the Birdman, written by John Field, first showed at The Bondi Pavilion (Sydney) for a two-week winter season. It then moved to the Mittagong Playhouse for another run a month later. 

The cast for the Bondi Pavilion show were Anthony Cogin as "Lester's father", Benj Daddario as "the Birdman", Ryan Desaunier, Amanda Dolby, Sam Moran, Emma Pask, Katrina Retallick as "Evelyn", Alyson Standen as "Miss Yahwhohow" and Alicia Wolfe. For the CD, the part of Miss Yahwhohow was sung by Bernadette Cogin. It was directed by Jacqueline Fallon, choreographed by Jacqueline Fallon and Leeanne Ashley. Produced by Caspian Productions via Richard Fallon and Mark Mooney.

References

Australian musicals
2001 musicals